High Plains Public Radio is a network of public radio stations serving the High Plains region of western Kansas, the Texas Panhandle, the Oklahoma Panhandle and eastern Colorado. Operated by the Kanza Society, it is headquartered in Garden City, Kansas and operates an additional studio in Amarillo, Texas.

History
The Kanza Society was founded in 1977. The network's flagship station, KANZ (91.1 FM) in Garden City, signed on in 1980 from a studio at a converted elementary school in nearby Pierceville. Since then, HPPR has added eleven other full-power stations in Kansas, Oklahoma, Colorado and Texas, as well as low-powered translators in Kansas and Texas. Most of these areas had never been previously served by an NPR station.

HPPR's coverage area is made up mostly of rural areas and small towns; by far the largest urban center is Amarillo.

The network offers two HD Radio subchannels. HD1 is a simulcast of the analog signal's NPR/classical/jazz format. HD2 is "HPPR Connect," which provides an extended schedule of news programming. Both channels are streamed live on the Internet.

Stations

Low power translators
High Plains Public Radio also has low-powered repeaters throughout western Kansas, as well as  the northern panhandle of Texas.

External links

NPR member networks